"Streets of Baltimore" is a heavily covered country song written by Tompall Glaser and Harlan Howard in 1966.

Although Glaser co-wrote the song, his group, Tompall Glaser & The Glaser Brothers, were not the first to record the song. Bobby Bare released his Chet Atkins-produced version in June 1966; the Glasers recorded theirs in September 1966.

The singer tells us he left his home to take his wife to where she wanted to be: Baltimore. After working hard and trying to make a home, and despite feeling proud to give his woman what she was longing for as well as kind of liking said streets, he finds out his wife loves the Baltimore night life more than she loves him, so he returns to his Tennessee farm without her.  

Gram Parsons' version of the song has been featured on the HBO series The Wire, which is set in Baltimore.

Pitchfork said, "Gram Parsons may have made it famous, but "Streets of Baltimore" belongs to Bobby Bare. From his album of the same name, it is a relic of Bare's first stint on the RCA Victor label, widely regarded to be his breakout period in country music. Bare's tender croon lends the song believable longing and regret, while the otherwise simple arrangement ups the drama with countrypolitan 'oohs' and 'ahhs'."

Recordings
Bleed the Dream
Bobby Bare
The Del McCoury Band
The Flying Burrito Brothers
Nanci Griffith & John Prine
John Prine
Jim Lauderdale
The Little Willies
Gram Parsons & Emmylou Harris
Charley Pride 
Red Meat
Skik (as De grachten van Amsterdam)
The Statler Brothers
Evan Dando
Bill Kirchen
The Bats
The Bottle Rockets
Tom Russell
Daniel O'Donnell
Uncle Tupelo

References 

Bobby Bare songs
Songs written by Harlan Howard
1966 songs
Songs written by Tompall Glaser
Songs about Baltimore
Songs about streets